Augustin Jean Meurmans (born 29 May 1997) is a Belgian field hockey player who plays as a midfielder for Racing Club de Bruxelles.

International career
He was part of the Belgian selection that placed for the final at the 2017 European Championship in Amstelveen. Initially, he was not selected for the 2018 World Cup but he replaced John-John Dohmen later in the tournament who had to withdraw injured. He played in Belgium's last four matches of the tournament, which they eventually won by defeating the Netherlands in the final. In November 2021 he announced he would take a break from the national team to focus on his studies.

Honours

Racing
Belgian Hockey League: 2021–22

Belgium
 Olympic gold medal: 2020
 World Cup: 2018
 FIH Pro League: 2020–21

References

External links

1997 births
Living people
People from Ottignies-Louvain-la-Neuve
Belgian male field hockey players
Male field hockey midfielders
2018 Men's Hockey World Cup players
Men's Belgian Hockey League players
Royal Racing Club Bruxelles players
Field hockey players at the 2020 Summer Olympics
Olympic field hockey players of Belgium
Olympic gold medalists for Belgium
Medalists at the 2020 Summer Olympics
Olympic medalists in field hockey
Sportspeople from Walloon Brabant